The Feuille d'or de la ville de Nancy is a literary award, awarded on the occasion of the  at Nancy. It rewards a Lorraine author or whose work concerns Lorraine.

List of laureates 
 2016: Hélène Gestern, L'Odeur de la forêt, Arléa
 2015: Carole Martinez, La terre qui penche, Gallimard
 2014: Benoît Duteurtre, L'ordinateur du Paradis, Gallimard
 2012: David Haziot, Le roman des Rouart, Fayard
 2011: Éric Reinhardt, Le Système Victoria
 2009: Jean Vautrin for all his work
 2008: Les enfants de l'école Gustave-Eiffel de Pompey and Michel Caffier - Qui a volé la Tour Eiffel ?
 2007: Michel Picard, Matantemma
 2006: , Brûlements
 2005: Anne-Sophie Brasme, Le Carnaval des monstres
 2004: Louisa Maurin, Fille de personne
 2003: Pierre Pelot, C'est ainsi que les hommes vivent
 2002: Jeanne Cressanges, Les Ailes d'Isis
 2001: Élise Fischer, L'Inaccomplie
 2000: François Bon et les écrivains SDF, La Douceur dans l'abîme
 1999: Philippe Claudel, Meuse, l'oubli
 1998: Michel Caffier, Le Hameau des mirabelliers
 1997: François Baudin, Histoire économique et sociale de la Lorraine
 1996: Jean-Noël Jeanneney, Une histoire des médias
 1995: Yves Courrière, Pierre Lazareff ou Le Vagabond de l'actualité
 1994: Françoise Giroud, Journal d'une Parisienne
 1993: Jacques Derogy and Jean-Marie Pontaut, Investigation - Passion
 1992: Jean Ferniot, Je recommencerais bien
 1991: Alain Ménargues, Les Larmes de la colère
 1990: Michel Castex, Un mensonge gros comme le siècle
 1989: René-Victor Pilhes, La Médiatrice
 1988: Michel Wieviorka, Terrorisme à la Une
 1987: Michèle Cotta, Les Miroirs de Jupiter
 1986: Claude Kévers-Pascalis, Crésus

References

External links 
 Le Livre sur la place

Feuille d'Or de la ville de Nancy
Awards established in 1986
Lorraine
1986 establishments in France